The wise woman of Abel is an unnamed figure in the Hebrew Bible. She appears in 2 Samuel 20, when Joab pursues the rebel Sheba to the city of Abel-beth-maachah. The woman, who lives in Abel, institutes a parley with Joab, who promises to leave the city if Sheba is handed over to him. The woman speaks to the people of the city, and they behead Sheba, throwing his head over the wall, at which Joab departs.

Susan Pigott notes that, like Abigail, the wise woman "prevents undue violence and bloodshed." 

According to an Aggadic Midrash, the wise woman of Abel was Serah bat Asher, a person living around 650 years earlier.

See also
Woman of Tekoa

References

Books of Samuel people
Biblical figures in rabbinic literature
Women in the Hebrew Bible
Unnamed people of the Bible